Sunrise Lake is a  water body located in Strafford County in eastern New Hampshire, United States, in the town of Middleton. The lake was originally known as Dump Reservoir. Water from Sunrise Lake flows to the Cocheco River, part of the Piscataqua River watershed.

The lake is classified as a warmwater fishery, with observed species including largemouth bass, smallmouth bass, chain pickerel, brown bullhead, white perch, bluegill, and yellow perch.

See also

List of lakes in New Hampshire

References

Lakes of Strafford County, New Hampshire